Michal Váňa (born 13 May 1963) is a former football player from Czechoslovakia, who played professionally in Europe and Asia.

Early career
Váňa played for numerous clubs in his native country of Czechoslovakia, including Dukla Prague, Slavia Prague and Benešov.

Career in Asia
Váňa was part of the Singapore M-League, which won the 1994 Malaysia Cup. He disappeared in mid-season, and remains a fugitive.
The ex-Malaysia Cup star was arrested and charged with six counts of match-fixing. He escaped from the country before he could be tried in court, leaving on a different passport after his original one had been confiscated.
According to a Singapore newspaper, Váňa's Bayshore Park condominium was almost completely emptied. He was given a lifetime ban from football by FIFA, which was later annulled.
He was last seen in Singapore on 28 September 1994, two days before his trial was to begin. 
In 2011, an Australian production company named Touchwood Productions claimed to have found Váňa, and they interviewed him for a documentary on the life of Abbas Saad, who was also linked to Váňa. Saad was charged and given a lifetime ban from football.

The Documentary featuring Michal Vana, titled "The Abbas Saad Story" was released and aired in Malaysia in March 2015 on ASTRO TV.

References

1963 births
Living people
Czech footballers
Dukla Prague footballers
SK Slavia Prague players
SK Benešov players
Czech expatriate footballers
Expatriate footballers in Singapore
Association football forwards